Ciemnice  is a village in the administrative district of Gmina Dąbie, within Krosno Odrzańskie County, Lubusz Voivodeship, in western Poland.

The village has a population of 458.

References

Ciemnice